The Uruguayan Championship 1916 was the 16th season of Uruguay's top-flight football league.

Overview
The tournament consisted of a two-wheel championship of all against all. It involved nine teams, and the champion was Nacional.

Teams

League standings

References
Uruguay - List of final tables (RSSSF)

Uruguayan Primera División seasons
Uru
1